New Horizons was a professional wrestling pay-per-view (PPV) event produced by Ring of Honor (ROH). It took place on July 26, 2008 from the Michigan State Fairgrounds and Expo Center in Detroit, Michigan, and was first aired on September 26.

Results

See also
2008 in professional wrestling
List of Ring of Honor pay-per-view events

References

External links
ROHwrestling.com

New Horizons, ROH
Events in Detroit
2008 in Detroit
Professional wrestling in Detroit
July 2008 events in the United States
2008 Ring of Honor pay-per-view events